Rocky Mountain is a 1950 American Western film directed by William Keighley and starring Errol Flynn. It also stars Patrice Wymore, who married Flynn in 1950. The film is set in California near the end of the American Civil War.

Filmink magazine called it "a hidden gem, one of Flynn's best Westerns."

Plot
A car pulls up to an historical marker in the desert that reads:

ROCKY MOUNTAIN, also known as Ghost Mountain. On March 26, 1865, a detachment of Confederate cavalry crossed the state line into California under secret orders from Gen. Robert E. Lee to rendezvous at Ghost Mountain with one Cole Smith, with instructions to place the flag atop the mountain, and though their mission failed, the heroism displayed by these gallant men honored the cause for which they fought so valiantly.

In 1865, eight horsemen trek across the California desert, arriving at Ghost Mountain. Led by Captain Lafe Barstow (Errol Flynn) of the Mississippi Mountain Rifles. The eight soldiers encounter a man who calls himself California Beal (Howard Petrie). As a last desperate effort to turn the tide of the war, Barstow's mission is to persuade Cole Smith and his 500 men to raid California on behalf of the Confederacy. From their vantage point on the mountain, the men see a Shoshone war party attack a stagecoach. Barstow's men charge and drive off the Shoshone after the stage overturns, rescuing driver Gil Craigie (Chubby Johnson ) and the only surviving passenger, Johanna Carter (Patrice Wymore), traveling to join her fiancé, Union Army officer Lt. Rickey (Scott Forbes).

That night, the Indians burn the stage. Next morning, a detachment of four Union soldiers and three Shoshone scouts examine the ashes. Barstow's men ambush the detachment, killing one and capturing the rest, including Lt. Rickey. From them, Barstow learns that the Union knows about their presence in California and that California Beal is actually Cole Smith himself. Smith leaves, promising to return in two days with his men. Craigie talks with the Shoshone scouts and learns that they are really a chief, Man Dog, and his sons. He warns Barstow that they will escape and return with their tribe. That night, while Jimmy (Dickie Jones) is on watch, the Indians try to escape. The soldiers kill two of them, but Man Dog evades their bullets.

In the morning, Rickey suggests that he take Johanna to a nearby garrison before the Indians arrive. Barstow, however, hopes that Smith's men will come before the Indians do and rejects the suggestion. Near dawn, Rickey's men jump their guards. One dies in the attempt, and another's recaptured, but Rickey makes his escape. The Southerners find a riderless horse but it turns out to be Smith's, not Rickey's, and they realize that help is not coming.

Barstow decides to use all his men to lure the Indians away from the mountain while Johanna, Craigie and the Union trooper escape. The greatly outnumbered Rebels ride into a box canyon and turn to fight, charging the Shoshone. During the battle, Rickey returns with a troop of Union cavalry, and Johanna tells Rickey what has happened. The cavalry attempt to save Barstow's men but are too late; all the Southerners have been killed. Rickey raises their rebel flag on top of Rocky Mountain to salute the bravery of their fallen foes.

Cast

 Errol Flynn as Capt. Lafe Barstow 
 Patrice Wymore as Johanna Carter
 Scott Forbes as Lt. Rickey 
 Guinn "Big Boy" Williams as "Pap" Dennison  (credited as Guinn Williams)
 Dickie Jones as Jimmy Wheat  (credited as Dick Jones)
 Howard Petrie as Cole Smith "California Beal"
 Slim Pickens as Plank 
 Chubby Johnson as Gil Craigie
 Robert "Buzz" Henry as Kip Waterson  (credited as Buzz Henry)
 Sheb Wooley as Kay Rawlins
 Peter Coe as Pierre Duchesne 
 "Rush" Williams as Jonas Weatherby

Production
The film was originally titled Ghost Mountain, the title of the original story by Alan Le May. Ronald Reagan badly wanted to do a Western at the time, and says Jack Warner promised he could star in one if the actor found an ideal story. Reagan claims he discovered Ghost Story and helped negotiate its purchase by Warners through his agent, MCA. Warner Bros purchased it in November 1948 for $35,000, with William Jacobs assigned to produce. Reagan was announced as a potential star in November 1948. Errol Flynn, who had appeared in a number of successful Westerns for Warners was always named as a possibility.

In March 1950 Ghost Mountain was put on Warners' schedule. By April the film was retitled Rocky Mountain and Flynn was given the lead role over Reagan, to the latter's annoyance, as he felt he had brought the story to the studio. Reagan left Warner Bros soon afterwards. (Flynn had meant to do another Western, Carson City but it was felt that script was not as ready.) Winston Miller was brought in to write the script.

In May Lauren Bacall was assigned to play the female lead under her contract with Warner Bros but turned it down and was suspended as a result. Bacall said at the time:

I turned it down because it's just not a part. It's kind of nothing. I'm not angry, I'm just incredulous. I've never been offered a role like this before. I don't want to do it and they shouldn't have to pay me. I shouldn't imagine they'll have any trouble replacing me.

She was replaced by Patrice Wymore, a dancer who had recently been put under contract to Warners. By July, Bacall would terminate her contract with Warners.

Filming started 29 May 1950 on location in Gallup, New Mexico. At the beginning of filming Flynn was engaged to Princess Irene Ghika. During filming he fell in love with Wymore. Their engagement was announced in August and they later married.

While making the film Flynn said he became interested in stories about Kit Carson and was going to make a film about Carson. However this never happened.

Reception

Critical reaction
The Washington Post called Rocky Mountain a "good and interestingly made picture".

The Los Angeles Times said "it comes so close to being an exceptional figure that no one could have been sorrier than this reviewer to see it fall short... the reason is, I think, the characterizations lack forceful definition."

Box Office
Rocky Mountain earned £125,231 at the English box office. In France, it had admissions of 1,459,012. According to Variety, the film earned $1.7 in America by the end of 1950.

Legacy
According to James Garner, the script for Rocky Mountain was used as the basis for the first episode of the TV series Maverick. The film was also used as the basis for the first episode of the television series Cheyenne (1955) entitled "Mountain Fortress" on September 20, 1955.

References
Notes

Bibliography

 Behlmer, Rudy. Inside Warner Brothers, 1935-51. London: Weidenfeld & Nicolson, 1987. .
 Thomas, Tony, Rudy Behlmer and Clifford McCarty. The Films of Errol Flynn. New York: Citadel Press, 1969. .

External links
 
 
 
 

1950 films
1950 Western (genre) films
American Western (genre) films
American black-and-white films
1950s English-language films
Films scored by Max Steiner
Films directed by William Keighley
American Civil War films
Warner Bros. films
Films set in California
Films shot in New Mexico
Films set in 1865
1950s American films